Załom-Kasztanowe (Załom to 2012) is a municipal neighborhood of the city of Szczecin, Poland situated on the right bank of Oder river, east of the Szczecin Old Town, and Szczecin-Dąbie.

Before 1945 when Stettin was a part of Germany, the German name of this suburb was Stettin-Arnimswalde.

Neighbourhoods of Szczecin